Kanne Kalaimaane is a 2022 Indian Tamil-language Drama television series directed by Raja Thanush. The series stars Pavithra Gowda, Nanda Gopal and Rashmi Prabhakar. It premiered on Star Vijay 10 October 2022, is also telecast on the digital platform Disney+ Hotstar.

Synopsis
Young mother Banumathi, who is blind, resides with her brother's family with her eight-year-old daughter Thamizh. Her sister-in-law is mistreating Bhanumathi and her kid. The main character, Ram, who was set to wed Bhanumathi, meets with an accident that occurs before their wedding while Bhanumathi is pregnant.

He does, however, live, but without recollection. He gets married to an affluent couple's daughter Madhuri, who helps him become a well-known actor. Married couple Ram and Madhuri also have a daughter. The young, blind mother Bhanumathi and her small daughter Thamizh are forced to go to the city, where Ram resides.

Cast

Main
 Pavithra Gowda as Bhanumathi
 Ram's 1st wife, A visually challenged young mom lives with her eight-year-old daughter Thamizh.
 Nanda Gopal as Ram
 A famous actor, Bhanumathi and Madhuri's Husband. he loses his memory.
 Rashmi Prabhakar as Maduri
 A rich family background girl, Ram's second wife.
 Samyuktha as Tamizh
 Bhanumathi and Ram's daughter.

Supporting
 Devipriya
 Latha Rao aa Latha
 Premi Venkat as Vijayalakshmi
 Sahasraa as Shalini
 David Solomon Raja
 Sheela
 R. Aravindraj
 Aathithyaa as Selva

References

External links
 Kanne Kalaimaane at Hotstar

Star Vijay original programming
Tamil-language melodrama television series
2022 Tamil-language television series debuts
Tamil-language television soap operas
Television shows set in Tamil Nadu
Tamil-language television shows